Pouch may refer to:
 A small bag such as a packet (container), teabag, money bag, sporran, fanny pack, etc.
 Marsupium (disambiguation), especially pouch (marsupial), an anatomical feature in which young are carried
 Cadaver pouch, a body bag
 Diplomatic pouch
 Electric heating pouch, medical apparatus, electric heating device for curative treatment
 Indiana pouch, a surgically created urinary diversion used to create a way for the body to store and eliminate urine for patients who have had their urinary bladders removed
 Ileo-anal pouch, surgically created intestinal reservoir which is in or added to the body
 Ostomy pouching system (colostomy bag), medical prosthetic that provides a means for the collection of waste from a diverted biological system
 Pouch laminator, lamination system that utilizes pouches
 Retort pouch, food and drink pouch
 Stand-up pouch a type of flexible packaging that stands erect for sale or storage
 Buffalo pouch, a small pouch worn on the wrist, carried from a strap around the neck, or from the waist like a fanny pack
 (U+1F45D) unicode symbol "POUCH", see Emoji

Places
 Pouch, Germany, a municipality in Saxony-Anhalt, Germany
 Pouch Cove, Newfoundland and Labrador
 Pouch Island, Newfoundland and Labrador

Species
 Pouch (orchids), Cypripedioideae, orchid species
 Pouched rat, African rodent characterized by large cheek pouches

See also
 
 
 Bursar, Latin for pouch or purse
 Pouch Attachment Ladder System (PALS)
 Throbbing Pouch, 1995 electronica hip-hip album by Wagon Christ
 Pooch (disambiguation)
 Purse (disambiguation)
 Sac (disambiguation)